Aeronautical station (also: aeronautical radio station) is – according to Article 1.81 of the International Telecommunication Union's (ITU) ITU Radio Regulations (RR) – defined as «A land station in the aeronautical mobile service. In certain instances, an aeronautical station may be located, for example, on board ship or on a platform at sea.»

Each station shall be classified by the service in which it operates permanently or temporarily.

See also

References / sources 

 International Telecommunication Union (ITU)

Radio stations and systems ITU
Air traffic control